Sarah Gourlay is a Scottish international lawn and indoor bowler born on 28 September 1937.

Bowls career
She played lead for the Scottish fours team when winning the 1985 World Outdoor Bowls Championship gold medal in Brisbane. In 1992 she won the 1992 World Indoor Bowls Championship in Guernsey defeating Mary Price in the final.

In 1993 she won the fours gold medal at the inaugural Atlantic Bowls Championships and four years later won a fours bronze at the Championships.

She also won the Scottish National Bowls Championships singles title in 1991 & 1995 and the pairs title in 1968 bowling for Annbank.

Family
She is from the famous Scottish Gourlay bowling family and she married David Gourlay Sr. Her son David Gourlay Junior is also a renowned lawn and indoor bowler and coach.

References

Scottish female bowls players
Living people
1937 births
Commonwealth Games medallists in lawn bowls
Commonwealth Games gold medallists for Scotland
Bowls World Champions
Indoor Bowls World Champions
Bowls players at the 1994 Commonwealth Games
Medallists at the 1994 Commonwealth Games